"Mayham" is the 68th episode of the HBO original series The Sopranos and the third of the show's sixth season. Written by Matthew Weiner and directed by Jack Bender, it originally aired on March 26, 2006.

Starring
 James Gandolfini as Tony Soprano / Kevin Finnerty
 Lorraine Bracco as Dr. Jennifer Melfi 
 Edie Falco as Carmela Soprano
 Michael Imperioli as Christopher Moltisanti
 Dominic Chianese as Corrado Soprano, Jr. * 
 Steven Van Zandt as Silvio Dante
 Tony Sirico as Paulie Gualtieri
 Robert Iler as Anthony Soprano, Jr. 
 Jamie-Lynn Sigler as Meadow Soprano
 Aida Turturro as Janice Soprano Baccalieri 
 Steven R. Schirripa as Bobby Baccalieri
 Frank Vincent as Phil Leotardo
 John Ventimiglia as Artie Bucco
 Ray Abruzzo as Little Carmine Lupertazzi
 Joseph R. Gannascoli as Vito Spatafore
 Dan Grimaldi as Patsy Parisi

* = credit only

Guest starring

Synopsis
Paulie and a member of his crew burglarize an apartment belonging to Colombian drug dealers in Newark. The apartment is not empty as expected and a fierce firefight ensues, leading to the deaths of the building superintendent and two drug dealers. Paulie and Cary find a huge amount of money. The score contributes to rising tensions within the Soprano family: Silvio makes rulings on how the money, and Eugene's former Roseville bookmaking revenue, should be split. None of the parties involved like his decisions. A reluctant boss, Silvio is later hospitalized after an asthma attack. In case Tony does not recover, Paulie and Vito delay paying the cut they owe to Carmela. Vito quietly starts a campaign to position himself as a potential new leader, maintaining a cordial relationship with the Lupertazzi acting boss Phil Leotardo, who is a second cousin of Vito's wife Marie. He also happens to be in the hospital when Meadow's fiancé Finn turns up and makes a threatening pass at him.

Christopher and Bobby confront A.J. when he attempts to buy a gun, intending to take revenge on Junior. Carmela sees a news report about the shooting, in which A.J. remarks that it is weird growing up in their family. She yells at her son, furiously telling him he is a "cross to bear", and then sobs in her room. The next day, she tells Dr. Melfi that while she knew what Tony was when she married him, their kids "don't decide who they're born to."

Chris' passion for the movie industry is reborn. He has Benny Fazio and Murmur rough up screenwriter J.T. Dolan, and orders him to write a script for a slasher mob film he wants to produce. Chris later arranges a meeting with potential investors, the chief adviser and partner being Little Carmine. J.T. comes up with the title, Cleaver, and explains the premise to the investors, including Silvio, Vito, and Larry Boy Barese, but they seem confused about its plot. Nevertheless, Chris assures them the film is a guaranteed success.

Although only family members are allowed to see Tony, Silvio and Paulie are smuggled in by Carmela and Meadow. Alone with Tony, Paulie treats his unconscious boss to a tedious and discontented monologue about his current life. Tony's heart rate escalates steadily, but Paulie does not notice it until he goes into cardiac arrest. Hospital staff rush in.

Tony's dream sequence from the previous episode has continued.
 
At his hotel room, Tony receives a summons from the Buddhist monks addressed to Kevin Finnerty, and he begins to question his identity. He seeks answers from the bartender and the monks but finds none. Tony is disturbed by muffled sounds from an adjoining room at his hotel (Paulie is talking to him), and he bangs angrily on the wall for quiet. Having found a flier for the Finnerty family reunion in his briefcase, he is greeted outside the venue by a man who looks like his cousin Tony Blundetto. The man tries to get Tony to enter the light-festooned house, assuring him that "everyone's here" and that he is "coming home"; but he also tells Tony that he must first let go of his "business" and hand over his briefcase. Tony replies that he has already given away a briefcase once which had "his whole life inside" and does not want to do it again. Standing at the steps of the house, Tony hesitates for some time. With the figure of someone similar to his mother standing by the doorway in front of him, and the faint voice of a little girl coming from the trees behind him pleading with him not to go (Meadow is calling to her father), Tony chooses not to enter the house.

Tony awakes in the hospital, asking, "I'm dead, right?" Later, heavily sedated and still almost unable to talk, Tony listens to an excited Christopher explain his movie venture to him; he says he left a position for Tony to become a major investor. Christopher then notices an Ojibwe saying taped onto the wall: "Sometimes I go about in pity for myself, and all the while, a great wind carries me across the sky." With Tony now conscious, Paulie and Vito anxiously rush to get their cuts to Carmela. They hand over the cash and she is grateful, but as they are leaving in the elevator, she turns around and sees them looking sour.

First appearances
 Marie Spatafore: Vito Spatafore's wife
 Patty Leotardo: Phil Leotardo's wife

Deceased
 Building Superintendent: inadvertently shot by Colombian #1 
 Colombian #1: shot by Cary DiBartolo and Paulie
 Colombian #2: shot by Cary DiBartolo and then stabbed by Paulie

Title reference
 The title is a malapropism; after Vito gives Paulie bad information about the stick-up job (saying the place was empty), Paulie does not want to give him his full cut of the money, saying that the job was "mayham."
 Disorder is within the ranks of the DiMeo/Soprano crime family, as there are disagreements between some members, dissent is growing, and, at one point, both its boss and substitute acting boss are hospitalized.
 Tony Soprano violently fights to stay alive.
 In legal terms, mayhem refers to the deliberate maiming or dismembering of a victim. The unused title for Christopher's screenplay is Pork Store Killer. As such, "Mayham" could be a nod to said slasher film (combining the words "mayhem" and "ham").

Production
 Ray Abruzzo (Little Carmine) is now promoted to the main cast and billed in the opening credits but only in the episodes in which he appears.
 Lorraine Bracco's sister Elizabeth joins the show playing the character of Marie, the wife of Vito Spatafore.

Other cultural references 
 As Vito pulls up alongside Paulie at the beginning of the episode, Paulie greets him by saying "Diary of a Thin Man," in reference to Vito's recent weight loss, misquoting the title of the Bob Dylan song "Ballad of a Thin Man."
 When confronted over his attempted purchase of a gun and told that he cannot get to his Uncle Junior anyway because he is in police custody, AJ says it's "difficult, not impossible," the same words spoken by Rocco Lampone in The Godfather Part II in reference to assassinating Hyman Roth.
 In another homage to The Godfather, when Benny Fazio unexpectedly speaks up at the movie pitch with a solution to the film's plot impasse, it harkens to the scene when Michael Corleone speaks up and calculatingly details how to assassinate Virgil Sollozzo and the corrupt police captain at a restaurant.
 Vito greets Finn, who flew over from California, as "Phineas Fogg" at the hospital.
 J.T. Dolan is discussing Beowulf when kidnapped from his writing class.
 When pitching Cleaver, Silvio, Christopher, and J.T. Dolan compare and contrast the film to The Ring, the Friday the 13th franchise, Freddy Krueger movies, and Halloween as well as to The Godfather II, Saw, and Ghostbusters franchises. 
 Tom Giglione says he needs some Irish Spring to look fresh again after a night spent beside Tony's bed.
 Phil Leotardo says everyone thought Vito looked like John Travolta when he married Phil's cousin Marie.
 Paulie Gualtieri refers to Vito as "Bluto" (John Belushi’s character in Animal House).
 Paulie Gualtieri refers to AJ as Van Helsing.
 Paulie Gualtieri refers to Carmela Soprano as the "Princess of Little Italy." This is a sarcastic reference to Steven Van Zandt and his band Little Steven and the Disciples of Soul, who recorded a song by the same name.
 In a rare session with Dr. Melfi, Carmela recalls her second date with Tony, in which he brought her father a $200 power drill as a gift. She says she knew there was "probably some guy with a broken arm" behind it and reflects on whether this made her like Tony less or more. This mimics Bracco's own character's reaction in Goodfellas when she realized what Henry Hill really was early in their relationship.

Music 
In the first scene, as Paulie is driving, "Smoky Places" by The Corsairs is playing.
"Donde Estan Las Gatas" by Daddy Yankee and Nicky Jam is playing in the Colombians' office when Paulie enters.
An acoustic version of Heart's "These Dreams" plays in the supermarket when Carmela and Dr. Melfi run into each other.
Sheryl Crow's rendition of "The First Cut Is the Deepest" is playing on Tony's stereo during his coma.
 Oh! What It Seemed To Be by Frank Sinatra is playing on the stereo while Carmela talks to the nurse and Meadow is asleep on the chair.
The mariachi music played in the country house when Tony Blundetto is welcoming Tony Soprano is "La Feria de las Flores" by Mariachi Vargas de Tecalitlán.
"When You Dance" by The Turbans is playing in the last scene while Christopher is talking to Tony in his hospital room.
A rendition by The Mystics of "Somewhere Over the Rainbow" is being played while Carmela is wetting Tony's lips.
The instrumental piece played over the end credits is "The Deadly Nightshade" by Daniel Lanois.
Series creator David Chase has stated that he originally wished to end the episode with the Beatles song "I'll Follow the Sun", but decided against it due to high licensing fees.

References

External links
"Mayham"  at HBO

2006 American television episodes
The Sopranos (season 6) episodes